Lion was a weekly British comics periodical published by Amalgamated Press/Fleetway Publications from 23 February 1952 to 18 May 1974. A boys' adventure comic, Lion was originally designed to compete with Eagle, the popular weekly comic published by Hulton Press that had introduced Dan Dare (ironically, Eagle was later merged into Lion). Lion lasted for 1,156 issues. 

By the 1960s Lion had settled into being one of the most popular British weekly titles of the time. Editor Bernard Smith was always proud to say that he had the latest issue of Lion delivered to Buckingham Palace every Friday, the young Prince Charles being an avid reader (in 1960, Prince Charles was 11 years old).

Publication history
In 1954, Amalgamated Press (AP) editor Reg Eves was named editor of Lion. Despite having no interest in science fiction, Eves was under orders from management to have a space hero to compete with Dan Dare, and commissioned Captain Condor from writer Frank S. Pepper. 

AP was acquired by IPC/Fleetway in 1959 (with Eves retiring as editor); partly as a result, Lion merged with several other comics during its life, including Sun in 1959, The Champion in 1960, Eagle in 1969, and Thunder in 1971.

By the early 1970s sales were slipping, and in 1974 Lion was merged with Valiant. Several Lion strips continued in Valiant, but that title merged with Battle Picture Weekly in 1976. Lion Annuals were published until 1983.

Content 
Lion's first issue contained a mix of text stories and comic strips. The flagship story in the original incarnation was Captain Condor – Space Ship Pilot, a science fiction adventure in the Dan Dare mould. The premiere issue also contained the first adventure of Robot Archie (called The Jungle Robot in early adventures) who would go on to become one of the title's most popular characters. The most popular story was Paddy Payne — Warrior of the Skies, written by Val Holding and drawn by Joe Colquhoun. 

Captain Condor was the cover feature from issue #1 to #283 (1952 to 1957); that spot was taken by Paddy Payne from 1957 to 1964. The military feature Badges of the Brave took over the cover from 1964 to early 1965. 

In the 1960s, Lion began to feature an increasing number of anti-hero characters such as The Spider and The Sludge (who would later battle Robot Archie in his own strip).

Karl the Viking, by Ken Bulmer and Don Lawrence, set in the Dark Ages, featured battles against a weird but impressive collection of legendary and fantasy monsters. It ran from 29 October 1960 to 29 September 1964, as a set of 13 stories, and is well-remembered. It was reprinted in Lion from 1 October 1966 to 7 October 1967, retitled as Swords of the Sea Wolves, with the lead character renamed Rolf the Viking. The strip was reprinted in the fellow IPC title Smash! from 15 Mar. 1969 to 3 April 1971, retitled Eric the Viking. It would later be reprinted again, in the European version of Vulcan, on that occasion translated into German and retitled Kobra.

Notable strips
 Adam Eterno (20 March 1971 – 18 May 1974) — a man who lives forever and can not be killed except by gold. He is transported through time each week. Strip inherited from Thunder (17 October 1970 – 13 March 1971); moved to Valiant (25 May 1974 – 16 October 1976).
 Badges of the Brave — military feature highlighting various famous regiments from world history.
 The Bartoc Brothers — two-page text story. Bartoc, a scientist makes four duplicates of himself. One has strength, one speed, one courage, and one genius, and they fight crime. However, two doubles are finally killed because the courageous one wanted more excitement and betrayed them. He and the genius died, and the series ended.
 Britain in Chains (later retitled The Battle for Britain) (29 February 1964 – 28 May 1966; later reprinted in Smash!) — Secret agent Vic Gunn (and his assistant Tubby) fights against Baron Rudolph, a usurper who has seized control of Britain using a secret weapon. The weapon emits a sound wave that paralyses anyone who isn't protected against it. Rudolph sets up a police state, similar in emblems and uniforms to medieval England at the time of King John, and Gunn leads the resistance against him. It was llustrated by Geoff Campion.
 Carson's Cubs
 Captain Condor — Space Ship Pilot (1952–1964) — rival space hero of Dan Dare (when that character was in Eagle). The comic was written by Frank S. Pepper, and drawn at various times by Geoff Campion and Brian Lewis.
 Dan Dare (from 1969) — stories from Eagle were reprinted in Lion after the comics merged.
 Gadgetman (4 May 1968 – 26 October 1968) — gadget-powered superhero with teenage sidekick Gimmick-Kid, by Jerry Siegel and Geoff Campion.
 Karl the Viking (29 October 1960 – 29 September 1964; reprinted 1 October 1966 – 7 October 1967; later reprinted in Smash!), by Ken Bulmer and Don Lawrence.
 Maroc the Mighty — a returning English crusader whose magic armlet The Hand of Zar gave superhuman strength. 
 Mowser — occupying the back cover, he was a cat who would always outwit his enemy, James the Butler.
 Oddball Oates — about a botanist named Albert Oates who gains incredible athletism when he inhales the burnt fumes of a certain herb. He is opposed by the sinister foreigner Dr. Vulpex.
 Paddy Payne — fighter ace.
 Phantom Viking — donning a magic helmet, a professor transforms into a Viking with great strength and the ability to fly but can lose his powers when the wind blows from the wrong direction.
 Robot Archie (1952; 1957–1974) — a powerful robot under the control of two men.
 Secrets of the Demon Dwarf
 Sergeants Four
 Spot the Clue
 The Sludge
 Turville’s Touchstone / The Spellbinder (3 May 1969 – 18 May 1974) — about Sylvester Turville, an ancient sorcerer in modern times (called Turville's Touchstone for the first nine months). It was illustrated by Geoff Campion.
 The Spider (1965–1969) — Part villain, part hero, he would fight master criminals using his skills and weapons. Created by writer Ted Cowan and artist Reg Bunn, Superman co-creator Jerry Siegel took over the writing of the character with his third adventure and would write the bulk of his stories.
 Texas Jack — Wild West hero based on John Baker Omohundro, real-life partner of Buffalo Bill Cody.
 Zip Nolan—Highway Patrol — also known as Spot the Clue with Zip Nolan, a one-page strip about an American motorcycle police officer in which he would spot a clue and so catch a criminal.

Albion 
In 2005–2006 many of IPC's characters, including several from Lion (such as Robot Archie, The Spider, and Zip Nolan), were featured in a six-issue limited series, plotted by Alan Moore, called Albion, published by the WildStorm imprint of DC Comics.

Staff
 Editor: Bernard Smith
 Script Editor: Ken Mennell
 Assistant Editor: David Gregory
 Editorial: Peter Smith, Geoff Kemp, Roger Protz, Terence Magee, Pat Brookman, Chris Lowder
 Letters: Reg "Skipper" Clarke
 Art: Royman Brown, Geoff Berwick, John Michael Burns, Ian Stead

Further reading
 Holland, Steve. Lion: King of the Story Papers (Bear Alley Books, 2013)
 Jewell, Stephen. "The Comic That Roared: Lion", Judge Dredd Megazine #421, July 2020, pp. 40–44.

References

Sources

External links
History of Lion at comicsuk
26pigs.com-British comics website

Comics magazines published in the United Kingdom
1952 comics debuts
1974 comics endings
Weekly magazines published in the United Kingdom
Defunct British comics
Fleetway and IPC Comics titles
Magazines established in 1952
Magazines disestablished in 1974
Magazines about comics